The Valea Largă is a left tributary of the river Dâmbovița in Romania. It flows into the Dâmbovița in Capu Coastei.

References

Rivers of Romania
Rivers of Dâmbovița County